James 'Jim' W. Bolin (born December 31, 1950 in Portland, Oregon) is an American politician and a Republican member of the South Dakota House of Representatives representing District 16 since January 2009. Bolin was the mayor of Canton, South Dakota from 2007 until 2008.

Education
Bolin earned his BA from Seattle Pacific University and his MA from the University of South Dakota.

Elections

South Dakota state Senate
2016 After serving his fourth term in the South Dakota House of Representatives, Bolin was term-limited from running again in the House. Bolin ran unopposed in the District 16 Republican Primary for the South Dakota Senate. In the general election, Bolin is running against Chad Skiles, a Democrat from Canton.

South Dakota House of Representatives
2014 Bolin ran in the District 16 Republican Primary for the South Dakota House of Representatives. In the Republican Primary, out of a total of 3156 votes cast, Bolin received 1329, Anderson received 1049, and Kevin D. Jensen, who did not advance, received 778. Bolin and Anderson advanced to the general election, where they were unopposed.
2012 Bolin and Representative Patty Miller were challenged in the four-way June 5, 2012 Republican Primary, where Bolin placed first with 864 votes (40.9%); in the four-way November 6, 2012 General election Bolin took the first seat with 6,760 votes (35.7%) and Representative Miller took the second seat ahead of returning 2010 Democratic challenger Ann Tornberg and Stanley Jacobson.
2010 With incumbent Republican Representative Lederman running for South Dakota Senate and leaving a District 16 seat open, Bolin and Patty Miller were unopposed for both the June 8, 2010 Republican Primary; in the three-way November 2, 2010 General election, Miller took the first seat and Bolin took the second seat with 4,821 votes (34.76%) ahead of Democratic nominee Ann Tornberg.
2008 When District 16 incumbent Democratic Representative Margaret V. Gillespie ran for South Dakota Senate and Republican Representative Joel Dykstra left the Legislature leaving both District 16 seats open, Bolin ran in the three-way June 3, 2008 Republican Primary and placed second with 1,224 votes (25.8%); in the four-way November 4, 2008 General election fellow Republican nominee Dan Lederman took the first seat and Bolin took the second seat with 5,377 votes (27.61%) ahead of Democratic nominees Janelle O'Connor and Brian Wells.

References

External links
Official page at the South Dakota Legislature
Campaign site
 

1950 births
Living people
Mayors of places in South Dakota
Republican Party members of the South Dakota House of Representatives
People from Canton, South Dakota
Politicians from Portland, Oregon
Seattle Pacific University alumni
University of South Dakota alumni
21st-century American politicians